Beaurepaire may refer to:

People
Beaurepaire (surname)

Places

England
Beaurepaire, Hampshire in the civil parish of Sherborne St John in Hampshire
Bearpark, County Durham, originally called Beaurepaire

France
 Beaurepaire, Isère
 Beaurepaire, Oise
 Beaurepaire, Seine-Maritime
 Beaurepaire, Vendée
 Beaurepaire-en-Bresse, in the Saône-et-Loire département
 Beaurepaire-sur-Sambre, in the Nord département

Other uses
 Beaurepaire station, a commuter rail station in Beaconsfield, Quebec, Canada
 Château de Beaurepaire, Montreuil, Pas-de-Calais